Buies Creek is a  long 3rd order tributary to the Cape Fear River in Harnett County, North Carolina, United States.

Course
Buies Creek rises about 1.5 miles southeast of Angier and then flows south to join the Cape Fear River about 1 mile southwest of Buies Creek.

Watershed
Buies Creek drains  of area, receives about 46.7 in/year of precipitation, has a wetness index of 492.65 and is about 22% forested.

See also
List of rivers of North Carolina

References

Rivers of North Carolina
Rivers of Harnett County, North Carolina
Tributaries of the Cape Fear River